Tsengel may refer to several places:

 Tsengel, Bayan-Ölgii, a sum (district) of Bayan-Ölgii Province in western Mongolia
 Tsengel Khairkhan, a mountain of the Altai Mountains in western Mongolia
 Tsengel, founder of Banana Records, a recording studio founded in 2018 Los Angeles California.

See also
 Stengel, a surname